Po Klan Thu (died 1828) was the ruler of Champa from 1822 to 1828. His Vietnamese name was Nguyễn Văn Vĩnh (阮文永).

In 1807, Po Klan Thu was appointed as the viceroy, or the deputy ruler of Champa. Champa ruler Po Saong Nyung Ceng (Nguyễn Văn Chấn) died in 1822. Lê Văn Duyệt, the viceroy of Cochinchina, proposed to let Po Phaok The (Nguyễn Văn Thừa) succeed; however, Emperor Minh Mạng wanted Bait Lan be the new ruler. At such a sensitive time, Ja Lidong revolted. Reluctantly, Minh Mạng installed Po Klan Thu as the new ruler and sent him back to Champa. Po Phaok Thu was appointed as his viceroy, or the deputy ruler.

Po Klan Thu put down the rebellion of Kai Nduai Bait in 1826. He died in 1828.

References

Kings of Champa
1828 deaths
Year of birth unknown